Lantz is a designated place located on the Shubenacadie River between the communities of Milford and Elmsdale, in the Municipality of East Hants and the Halifax Regional Municipality, Nova Scotia, Canada. Lantz was considered by Statistics Canada as a "Retired population centre."

As of 2011, the population according to Nova Scotia government was 3,326 but only 1,533 according to Statistics Canada. In 2016 Census, Statistics Canada reported the population of Lantz was 2,229, an increase of 45.4%.

Demographics 

References

Communities in Hants County, Nova Scotia
Designated places in Nova Scotia